Thierry Ascione  (born 17 January 1981) is a retired professional tour male tennis player from France. He turned pro in 2000 and retired in September 2010, reaching a career-high singles ranking of World No. 81 in February 2004.

He played Roger Federer in the second round of Roland Garros 2007, saving five match points in the third set and holding two set points before eventually losing in straight sets.

He coached the former World No.3 WTA player, Elina Svitolina. 
He was also coach to former World No.5 ATP player Jo-Wilfried Tsonga and former World No.7 Richard Gasquet. He is currently coaching Lucas Pouille since 2021.

Trivia
Began playing tennis at age eight with his older brother, Frédéric.
His uncle was European boxing champion and another uncle was World military boxing champion.
Coached by former ATP professional and countryman Jérôme Potier.
Was Marat Safin's last ATP match win after holding 3 match points at the 2009 BNP Paribas Masters in Paris, Bercy.
He is the godfather of Julien Boutter's son, Oscar.

Performance timelines

Singles

Doubles

ATP Challenger and ITF Futures finals

Singles: 18 (11–7)

Doubles: 9 (4–5)

External links
 
 
 
 Ascione world ranking history

1981 births
Living people
French male tennis players
French tennis coaches
People from Rueil-Malmaison
People from Villeurbanne
Sportspeople from Lyon Metropolis